opened in Hirosaki, Aomori Prefecture, Japan in 1977. It lies within Hirosaki Park, in the former grounds of Hirosaki Castle. As of March 2016, the collection numbered some eighteen thousand items, including an assemblage of artefacts excavated from the Sunazawa Site that have been designated an Important Cultural Property.

See also
 List of Historic Sites of Japan (Aomori)
 Aomori Prefectural Museum

References

External links

  Hirosaki City Museum

Museums in Aomori Prefecture
Hirosaki
Museums established in 1977
1977 establishments in Japan